The 1919 New Zealand general election was held on Tuesday, 16 December in the Māori electorates and on Wednesday, 17 December in the general electorates to elect a total of 80 MPs to the 20th session of the New Zealand Parliament. A total number of 560,673 (80.5%) voters turned out to vote.

In 1919 women won the right to be elected to the House of Representatives. The law was changed late that year, and with only three weeks' notice, three women stood for Parliament.

They were Ellen Melville in Grey Lynn, Rosetta Baume in Parnell, and Aileen Cooke in Thames. Ellen Melville stood for the Reform Party and came second. She stood for Parliament several more times and generally polled well but never won a seat.

Results
Though Labour Party captured only eight seats it received nearly a quarter of the votes – a shock to conservative minds due to Labour being founded only three years earlier in 1916.

Party totals

Votes summary

Electorate results

The table below shows the results of the 1919 general election:

Key

|-
 |colspan=8 style="background-color:#FFDEAD" | General electorates
|-

|-
 |colspan=8 style="background-color:#FFDEAD" | Māori electorates
|-

|}

Summary of changes
A boundary redistribution resulted in the abolition of four electorates:
 , held by Harry Holland
 , held by Robert Scott
 , held by William Dickie
 , held by William Thomas Jennings
 , held by Robert Wright

At the same time, four new electorates were created:
 , previously abolished in 1911
 , first created through the 1918 electoral redistribution
 , first created through the 1918 electoral redistribution
 , first created through the 1918 electoral redistribution
 , previously abolished in 1911

Notes

References